The University of New South Wales Australian National Football Club plays Australian rules football.

Abbreviated History

The University of New South Wales Australian National Football Club (UNSW-ANFC), also known as “the Whalies”, was formed in 1962 to participate in the Australian University Games, but it wasn’t until the following year that the club actually fielded a team.

In 1964 the club started regular local competition. And while they combined with Sydney University during their first regular season, the two universities also quickly developed a strong rivalry. UNSW were victorious in their inaugural clash and took home a perpetual trophy donated by Shell.

In that same year the club first came to the attention of the national media.

It was in 1966 that the club first started winning premierships. They appeared in four consecutive grand finals, and won the 1968 premiership by 97 points! The following year the club was promoted a division but continued to win. From 1971 the club won five more first grade premierships (the last in 1994) and nine reserve grade premierships (the last in 1996). The club continued to appear regularly in grand finals up until the merger with the Eastern Suburbs Australian Football Club in 1999.

In the University Games the club did not do as well. The club’s only medal was won in 1995 after defeating Monash University in Darwin, Northern Territory for the bronze.

In 1985, the club set an Australian record for the highest score recorded by a senior grade team in an Australian National Football game with a score of 69 goals and 32 behinds (446 points) against Baulkham Hills who didn’t score a single point. The record was subsequently beaten, but remarkably the club recaptured the record in 1994 with a score of 81 goals and 49 behinds (535 points) against Blacktown who scored only one point.

Since the 1999 merger the club became known as the UNSW-Eastern Suburbs Bulldogs.

External links
Official Uni-NSW Eastern Suburbs Bulldogs Website

University Australian rules football clubs
Australian rules football clubs in Sydney
University of New South Wales student organisations
Australian rules football clubs established in 1962
1962 establishments in Australia